Charles Shadwell may refer to:

 Charles Shadwell (playwright) (died 1726), English playwright
 Charles Shadwell (Royal Navy officer) (1814–1886)
 Charles Shadwell (musician) (1898–1979), British conductor and bandleader
 Charles Shadwell (priest) (1853–1936), provost of Oriel College, Oxford